Marios Tokas (8 June 1954 – 27 April 2008) was a Cypriot composer of traditional music born in Limassol, Cyprus. During the 1974 invasion, he fought as a soldier against the Turkish invaders. In 1975, he went to Athens in order to study in the philosophical school. At the same time, he studied in the Ethniko Odio because he wanted to start a career as a musician. In 2004, Tokas and his six-member orchestra gave a concert in Vienna. The concert was co-organised by the Greek Society of Austria and the Athens Sports Association "Pantalkis" with the support of the General Secretariat of Hellenism Abroad of the Greek Foreign Ministry, under the auspices of the Cypriot ambassador to Austria.

Death
On 27 April 2008, Tokas died of cancer in Athens. Cypriot president Dimitris Christofias had visited him in the hospital towards the end of his life. He was buried in First Cemetery of Athens.

He is regarded by some as the most prominent composer in Cyprus and Greece. M. Tokas may be remembered for his passion for Cyprus and the connection of his music with Cyprus.

References

External links
www.mariostokas.gr Official website
Official Facebook Page
Vienna Performance

1954 births
2008 deaths
Cypriot composers
Male composers
People from Limassol
20th-century Cypriot male singers